Hans Helmut Hertell (born 1950/1951, San Juan, Puerto Rico) is a former United States Ambassador to the Dominican Republic. Nominated by President George W. Bush in the summer of 2001, Hertell was sworn in as Ambassador on November 8, 2001, and began his duties in the Dominican Republic on November 29, 2001. When he finished his tour on May 1, 2007, Ambassador Hertell was the second longest serving U.S. Ambassador in the world.

Early years
Hertell was a co-founder of Goldman, Antonetti, Ferraiuoli, Axtmayer and Hertell, now the third largest full service law firm in Puerto Rico. From 1992-96, Hertell was managing director for the Caribbean and Latin America affairs at Black, Kelly, Scruggs & Healey, a government and public affairs company based in Washington, D.C. In 1989, he served as a member of the Commission to Review U.S. Magistrates for Reappointment of the U.S. District Court for the District of Puerto Rico.  Between 1982-84, he served as political and legal advisor to the Governor of Puerto Rico, as well as to the Attorney General, the Secretary of Agriculture and the Secretary of the Treasury of the Commonwealth of Puerto Rico.

Ambassador
Hertell was sworn in as the United States Ambassador to the Dominican Republic on November 8, 2001.  At the time the Dominican Republic was the fourth largest trading partner of the United States in the Western Hemisphere after Canada, Brazil and Mexico and the largest economy in Central America and the Caribbean. In April 2007, Hertell officially left his post as ambassador. He was replaced by Chargé d'affaires Roland W. Bullen, who served as the interim head of the embassy until mid-November 2007. On November 15, 2007, P. Robert Fannin was sworn in as the new ambassador.

Post-Ambassador years
Hertell remains active in fundraising for the Republican Party. He holds a Bachelor of Arts degree from Fordham University of New York City and a juris doctor from the University of Puerto Rico at Río Piedras. He is also involved with the operations and investments of the Barrick Gold Corporation in the Dominican Republic. He has been the Chairman of the Board at U.S. Precious Metals, Inc since January 9, 2015. He has been a Director of U.S. Precious Metals, Inc since May 31, 2013 and Colt Resources Inc. since April 14, 2015. He also serves as a Director of InterEnergy Holdings. In 2009, Hertell lobbied with Dominican authorities for the required permissions and licenses. He joined with Steve Swindal to open a baseball academy in Boca Chica in 2009.

References

1950s births
Ambassadors of the United States to the Dominican Republic
Fordham University alumni
Puerto Rican people of German descent
21st-century Puerto Rican politicians
21st-century Puerto Rican lawyers
Puerto Rican businesspeople
People from San Juan, Puerto Rico
Living people
Date of birth missing (living people)
Republican Party (Puerto Rico) politicians
University of Puerto Rico alumni